Manika may refer to:

Places 
Manika (district), sub-district of Latehar, Jharkhand state, India
Manika, Greece, an ancient town
 Bara Manika
 Manika, Kolwezi
 Manika Block
 Roshan Manika

People 
Manika (singer) (born 1993), American pop musician
Manika Batra (born 1995), Indian table tennis player
Manika Gauduni, a historical figure in the Jagannath culture

Film 
Manika (film), a 1986 Indian film
Manika, une vie plus tard, a 1989 movie based on the concept of reincarnation

Other uses 
 Manika (Vidhan Sabha constituency)